Wingas GmbH is a gas distribution company located in Kassel, Germany. It is a subsidiary of Gazprom, which held its shares through W&G Beteilligungs-GmbH & Co. KG.

History
Wingas was established in 1993 by BASF subsidiary Wintershall and Gazprom. Since 25 October 2007, Wintershall owned 50% plus one share, while Gazprom's stock is 50% less one share.  In December 2013, Wintershall and Gazprom agreed an assets swap which made Wingas a wholly owned subsidiary of Gazprom.  BASF and Gazprom completed the swap of assets by September 30, 2015.

Operations 
Wingas operates in Germany, Belgium, Denmark, France, the United Kingdom, Austria, the Netherlands and the Czech Republic. In Germany, it has a 20% market share.

In 2004 Wingas purchased the Saltfleetby Gas Field in the United Kingdom, which is operated by Wingas Storage UK and is used for gas storage.

Besides natural gas, Wingas leases the free transmission capacity in fiber-optic cables to commercial customers.

References

External links

 
 

Natural gas companies of Germany
Gazprom subsidiaries
Energy companies established in 1993
Non-renewable resource companies established in 1993
1993 establishments in Germany